Inkisi Airport  is an airport serving the town of Inkisi (also known as Kisantu), Kongo Central province, Democratic Republic of the Congo.

References

Airports in Kongo Central Province
Kisantu